Praha-Holešovice railway station is located in Holešovice, a northern district of Prague, capital city of the Czech Republic. Opened in 1985, the station was originally used as a terminus for international fast trains coming from the east. Since the completion of the Nové spojení ("new connection") in 2010, however, these trains terminate at the more central hub, Praha hlavní nádraží. Nevertheless, international trains from hlavní nádraží running north to Dresden and Berlin, as well as northwest-bound inter-regional trains still call here. The station is adjacent to Prague Metro's Nádraží Holešovice station on line C and also to stops of the same name on lines 6, 12, and 17 of the city's tramway system, as well as a bus station.

Services

Holesovice
Railway stations opened in 1985
Prague 7
1985 establishments in Czechoslovakia
Railway stations in the Czech Republic opened in the 20th century